Harker Run is a stream located in Wetzel County, West Virginia. The mouth of Harker Run is approximately 300 m (1000 ft) south-southwest of the small village of Earnshaw. It drains into Long Drain at its northeastern end at 330 m (1080 ft) above sea level. At its highest point, the creek is at approximately 430 m (1400 ft) elevation. The entire length of the stream is paralleled by Harker Run Road.

See also
List of rivers of West Virginia

Rivers of Wetzel County, West Virginia
Rivers of West Virginia